Sofia Christine Wylie (born January 7, 2004) is an American actress, singer, and dancer. She began her career in dance before gaining prominence through her role as Buffy Driscoll on the Disney Channel comedy-drama series Andi Mack (2017–2019).

Wylie has continued to work with Disney; her roles include Cory Bailey in the film Back of the Net (2019), Riri Williams in the Marvel Rising animated franchise, Mia Brooks in the web series Shook (2019), and Gina Porter in the Disney+ mockumentary High School Musical: The Musical: The Series (2019–). She also stars in the Netflix fantasy film The School for Good and Evil (2022).

Early life
Wylie was born in Scottsdale, Arizona, and grew up in Tramonto, to parents Chris and Amy. Her father is of African-American and Korean descent, while her mother's descent is German and English. She has an older sister, Isabella "Bella", who appeared in an episode of Chopped Junior and won. Wylie has been dancing since she was 5 years old and trained in acting at Second City Training Center in Hollywood, California.

Career
Wylie started her career in dance, making appearances on So You Think You Can Dance in 2011 and 2016 and America's Got Talent in 2015. She performed on Justin Bieber's Purpose World Tour. In 2017, she started the Internet-based 4K Dance Series with Utah dancers while filming Andi Mack. In 2019, she started Dancing with Sofia Wylie, an IGTV educational dance series.

In 2016, it was announced that Wylie would star in her first major acting role as Buffy Driscoll, a main character and one of Andi's best friends on the Disney Channel series Andi Mack. Wylie made her film debut as Cory Bailey in the 2019 Australian film, Back of the Net, which had a theatrical release in Australia and aired on Disney Channel in the United States. Wylie debuted her first single, "Side by Side", for Marvel Rising: Chasing Ghosts in January 2019. She voiced the role of Riri Williams in the animated TV movie Marvel Rising: Heart of Iron, which aired on Disney XD. She reprised the role for Marvel Rising: Battle of the Bands and in season 3 of Spider-Man.

On February 15, 2019, Wylie was cast as Gina Porter in the Disney+ series High School Musical: The Musical: The Series, which was available from launch that November. It was announced in August that Wylie would star as Mia in Shook, a short-form web series premiering on Disney Channel's YouTube channel in September.

In March 2019, Wylie launched a production company, AIFOS and optioned the rights to adapt Jenny Torres Sanchez's novel, The Fall of Innocence, as its first project.<ref>{{cite journal|url=https://thefandom.net/disney-star-options-rights-to-ya-drama-the-fall-of-innocence/|title=Disney Star Options Rights To YA Drama 'The Fall of Innocence|journal=The Fandom|date=8 March 2019|access-date=9 June 2019}}</ref> In June 2019, Wylie signed with United Talent Agency.

In December 2020, it was announced that Wylie would star alongside Sophia Anne Caruso in the upcoming Netflix fantasy film, The School for Good and Evil'', an adaptation of the book series by Soman Chainani. Wylie plays the role of Agatha.

Filmography

Film

Television

Awards and nominations

References

External links

2004 births
Living people
21st-century American actresses
Actresses from Scottsdale, Arizona
African-American child actresses
African-American female dancers
21st-century African-American women singers
American actresses of Korean descent
American child actresses
American female dancers
American women singers
American television actresses
American voice actresses
American web series actresses
American people of German descent
American people of English descent